Huang Wei (1904–1989) was a Chinese Nationalist military general who fought in the Encirclement Campaigns, Second Sino-Japanese War and Chinese Civil War.

Early life and career
Huang was born into a rural intellectual family in Guixi, Jiangxi province in 1904. With the help of local friends and townsmen he was admitted to the elite Whampoa Military Academy. He was loyal, dutiful and brave in battle and caught the attention of Chen Cheng, his superior and senior military instructor who introduced him to Generalissimo Chiang Kai-shek. By the end of 1927, he was promoted to regimental commander of the 9th corps, in 1928 he was reassigned as regimental colonel of the 11th division, which Chen Cheng was the commander. In 1928 he was enrolled in the Army War College and after graduation he was promoted to 32nd brigade commander in the 11th division, now as part of the 18th corps, again Chen Cheng was the Corps superior general officer.

In 1933 he went to Germany to study and returned to China in 1937, while in his absence he was promoted to commander of the 11th division in 1934. In September 1937, he led the 67th division of the 18th corps in the Battle of Shanghai against the Imperial Japanese Army. In 1938 he was promoted to Corps commander of 18th corps and elevated to the rank of lieutenant general next year. In 1940 he was assigned as commander of the 54th corps and defense commander of Kunming, Yunnan province. Over next several years, he was assigned to a series important positions in the National Military Council and army training department. In 1945 he became commander of 31st army and deputy head of the logistical department. In 1948 he was made commandant of the newly established officer candidate school and headed the 12th army.

Huaihai Campaign
In November 1948, Huang Wei led the 12th army from Henan province toward Eastern of Xuzhou to fight the communists, However communist moles in the Kuomintang department of defense, such as Guo Ruhuai and Liu Fei, leaked vital military plans to the communist commanders. The American-armed 12th army headed into a trap sprang by the communist forces in nearly Su County, Anhui province, less than 30 miles from Xuzhou. In the great Shuangduiji Campaign, which lasted nearly a month and the 12th army was destroyed. Huang's attempt to breakout from communist blockade was foiled when one of his division commanders went over to communists with his unit. He tried to break out again but was captured alive, only his deputy commander Hu Lien was able to escape back to Nanjing.

Study of perpetual motion
While in Communist prisons, Huang Wei refused to admit that he was wrong in supporting Chiang Kai-shek and the Kuomintang government. In order to escape communist indoctrination classes, he devoted his time to the study of perpetual motion, in 1968 he received personal funds from Zhou Enlai so he could conduct experiments. The experiments did not succeed, but when he was released in 1975 he continued to pursue the concept. He died in Beijing on March 30, 1989.

References

US Naval War College

National Revolutionary Army generals from Jiangxi
Chinese people of World War II
1904 births
1989 deaths
Chinese prisoners of war
Recipients of the Order of the Sacred Tripod
People from Yingtan